Hasnawi (also spelled Hasnaoui) is an Arabic family name, it may refer to:

 Cheikh El Hasnaoui, Algerian singer
 Nadia Hasnaoui, Norwegian television presenter
 Mithal al-Hasnawi, Iraqi terror suspect
 Salih al-Hasnawi, Iraqi doctor and politician

Arabic-language surnames